Maxidrom was an annual international musical festival organized by Radio Maximum station.

History

References

External links
Official website

Rock festivals in Russia
Music festivals in Russia